Council of Donetsk may refer to:

People's Council of the Donetsk People's Republic, the regional parliament of the Donetsk People's Republic, an unrecognized republic in the Russian Federation.
Donetsk Oblast Council, the provincial parliament of the Ukrainian Oblast Donetsk.